Hunterston B nuclear power station is a shut down AGR nuclear power station in North Ayrshire, Scotland. It is currently operated by EDF Energy, and began producing electricity in 1976. The station ceased generation on 7 January 2022. On 19 May 2022, EDF announced that defueling was started on the two Hunterston B units. This process is expected to take over three years to complete, and it involves the complete emptying of all fuel channels from both reactors. This amounts to over 300 channels from each reactor, each containing 8 fuel elements. Fully loaded flasks containing the used fuel are scheduled to be dispatched from the site by rail to Sellafield at a maximum rate of three per week.
 

Hunterston B is similar in design to sister station Hinkley Point B, which ceased operations in August 2022.

History
The construction of Hunterston B was undertaken by a consortium known as The Nuclear Power Group (TNPG). The two advanced gas-cooled reactors (AGR) were supplied by TNPG and the turbines by C. A. Parsons & Co. Hunterston B began to generate electricity on 6 February 1976.

On 3 December 1977, The Times reported that seawater had entered the reactor through a modification of the secondary cooling system. The secondary cooling system uses fresh water to cool parts including the bearings of the gas circulators, which circulate the carbon dioxide coolant through the reactor to the boilers. When maintenance work was carried out on the reactor and the pressure in the gas cooling system was reduced, sea water was able to flow back up this bypass pipe and into the reactor. The residual heat of the reactor was such that the seawater evaporated rapidly, leaving deposits of salt in the reactor around the gas circuit. It was estimated at the time that the reactor could be out of operation for a year, that the repairs could cost £14million, and that electricity tariffs would have to rise by between 1 and 2 per cent. Extensive modelling work was performed in the Nuclear Power Company's (NPC) Whetstone, Leicestershire, fluid flow laboratories to determine where the salt would have been deposited, and the salt was successfully removed by technicians using vacuum cleaners and the plant returned to operation.

In February 1997, there was concern that contaminated  gas from the plant had entered three road tankers and then entered the food chain via soft drinks and beers. Carlsberg-Tetley withdrew all its gas cylinders in Scotland as a result of finding contamination in one.

In December 1998, an INES Level 2 incident occurred after severe winds and sea spray disabled all four power lines to the site during the Boxing Day Storm of 1998. After multiple grid failures in a short period of time, emergency diesel generators failed to start. Normally, in the absence of power for the reactor cooling pumps, the reactor would be passively cooled. However, the emergency control system which would have initiated passive cooling failed to act, as it had not been reset. Reactor cooling was reinstated after fourhours. There was considerable confusion and delay in restoring power as plant schematics and security systems were computerised but were rendered inoperable due to lack of electrical power. Due to the inherent safety margins of the AGR reactor design, there was no reactor damage, and the plant would have tolerated loss of cooling for 20hours. The subsequent investigation made several recommendations: redesign of the insulators on the 400kV power lines, installation of an additional 132kV power line for emergency power, a second diesel generator building remote from the first, installation of an uninterruptible power supply for the reactor safety systems and for essential computer equipment, provision of hard copy plant schematics and emergency protocols, and revised staff training procedures including simulation of multiple simultaneous system failures.

In 2006, concerns were raised in a report commissioned by Greenpeace that the graphite moderator core in each of the twin reactors at Hunterston B might have developed structural problems in the form of cracking of the bricks (as at similar AGR power stations).

Its net electrical output was 1,215MW. In 2007, the reactors were restricted to operating at a reduced level of around 70% of full output (around 850MWe net). Subsequent work during maintenance shutdowns have resulted in Reactor 3 operating at around 82% (540Mwe net) in early 2011, and Reactor 4 at around 73% (480MWe net). In total this equates to around 1,020MWe gross output from the generators. Internal load of 90MWe brings net output to approximately 930MWe. Hunterston B is capable of supplying the electricity needs of over 1million homes.

Hunterston B was originally planned to operate until 2011. In 2007, planned operation was extended by five years to 2016. In December 2012, EDF said it could (technically and economically) operate until 2023.

Graphite core keyway root cracks

In October 2014, it was reported that cracks had been found in one of the reactors at the plant following routine inspections which began in August 2014. Two of about 3,000 graphite bricks in the core of reactor four at Hunterston were affected. The plant's operator, EDF Energy, said the cracking was predicted to occur as the station ages and said that the issue would not affect the safe operation of the reactor.

In October 2016, it was announced that super-articulated control rods would be installed in the reactor because of concerns about the stability of the reactors' graphite cores. The Office for Nuclear Regulation (ONR) had raised concerns over the number of fractures in keyways that lock together the graphite bricks in the core. An unusual event, such as an earthquake, might destabilise the graphite so that ordinary control rods that shut the reactor down could not be inserted. Super-articulated control rods should be insertable even into a destabilised core.

In early 2018, a higher rate of new keyway root cracks than modelled was observed in Reactor 3 during a scheduled outage, and EDF announced in May 2018: "While Hunterston B Reactor 3 could return to operation from the current outage, it will remain offline while the company works with the regulator to ensure that the longer term safety case reflects the findings of the recent inspections and includes the results obtained from other analysis and modelling."

In December 2018, EDF pushed back their estimated return to service date to March 2019 for Reactor 4 and April 2019 for Reactor 3, to allow for further modelling work and a new seismic analysis. In March 2019, pictures of the cracking were released with EDF stating that it intended to seek permission from the ONR to restart reactor 3 by raising the operational limit for the number of cracks. This was above the operational limit of 350 fractures, and EDF intends to present a new safety case for an operational limit of 700 cracks.

One reactor was restarted on 25 August 2019 then shut down again on 10 December 2019. In August 2020, EDF received regulatory approval to restart the two reactors, in August and September 2020 respectively, before moving to defuel and decommission the plant starting no later than 7 January 2022. The first reactor, Unit 3, was taken offline for the final time at midday on 26 November 2021. Reactor 4 was shut down at midday on 7 January 2022, ending 46 years of generation at the station.

See also

Hunterston A nuclear power station nearby, shutdown 1990, now being decommissioned.
Nuclear power in Scotland
Nuclear power in the United Kingdom
Energy policy of the United Kingdom
Energy use and conservation in the United Kingdom
Western HVDC Link, a 2.2 GW cable from Hunterston to Wales

References

External links
 Hunterston B nuclear power station

Former nuclear power stations in Scotland
Nuclear power stations using Advanced Gas-cooled Reactors
Firth of Clyde